Finite completeness may refer to:
 Complete category, a category in which all finite limits exist
 Completeness (order theory)#Finite completeness, a condition for partially ordered sets